The 2nd National People's Congress was in session from 1959 to 1964. It held four sessions in this period.

Elections to the Congress 
Since the succeeding Congress was to be the first to be elected under the 1954 Constitution of the People's Republic of China, the Standing Committee of the National People's Congress, in February 1959, finished all the preparatory work for selection of deputies, which were voted by representatives of the provincial legislatures and the city legislatures of the then two Direct-administered municipalities of China: Beijing and Shanghai. The elections were held in accordance with the 1953 Electoral Law. The results of the election were a clear Communist victory amongst the parties of the United Front, with the party electing 1,048 representatives, the minor parties 179.

First plenary session 

The first session was held in 18-28 April 1959. During the first session, Mao Zedong relinquished his role as chairman of the People's Republic to Liu Shaoqi. The Congress elected the state leaders:

President of the People's Republic of China: Liu Shaoqi
Vice President of the People's Republic of China: Soong Ching-ling and Dong Biwu
Chairman of the Standing Committee of the National People's Congress: Zhu De
Premier of the State Council: Zhou Enlai
President of the Supreme People's Court: Xie Juezai
Prosecutor-General of the Supreme People's Procuratorate: Zhang Dingcheng

References

External links
 Official website of the NPC

National People's Congresses
1959 in China